Birmingham Steel Corporation was a steel producer in the United States, which made steel merchant and rebar products. The company was formed in 1983 by AEA Investors, Inc. and managed by CEO James Todd. It bought steel mini-mills in Kankakee, Illinois and the mills previously run by Todd at Birmingham Bolt. They then bought the Jackson, Mississippi-based Mississippi Steel Division of Magna Corp. The company went public on NYSE in 1985.

In 1993, the company purchased the American Steel and Wire Company.

In June 2002, after several consecutive quarters of losses, the company filed for Chapter 11 bankruptcy protection. Its remaining steel mills and other assets were purchased by Nucor in December 2002 for approximately $615,000,000.

References

Bibliography

Steel companies of the United States
Companies based in Birmingham, Alabama
Companies formerly listed on the New York Stock Exchange
Companies that filed for Chapter 11 bankruptcy in 2002
Companies established in 1983
Companies disestablished in 2002
1983 establishments in Alabama
2002 disestablishments in Alabama